Neil Tennant (born 1 March 1950) is an American philosopher. He is Arts & Humanities Distinguished Professor of Philosophy at the Ohio State University; and, before taking up his appointment at the Ohio State University he held positions at the University of Edinburgh, the University of Stirling, and the Australian National University.

Along with Michael Dummett, Crispin Wright, Tennant is one of the most notable figures who have attempted to extend the project of providing anti-realist semantics for empirical language. He has also written extensively on intuitionistic logic and other non-classical logics.

Education and career

Tennant was the editor of the journal American Philosophical Quarterly from 2004 to 2007.

He was elected to the Australian Academy of the Humanities, as a Corresponding Fellow, in 1990.

Selected publications 
 Natural Logic, Edinburgh University Press, 1978, ix+196pp.; Japanese translation by T. Fujimura for Orion Press, 1981; second, revised edition, 1990.
 Philosophy, Evolution and Human Nature (with F. von Schilcher), Routledge and Kegan Paul, 1984, viii+283 pp. 
 Anti-Realism and Logic: Truth as Eternal, Clarendon Library of Logic and Philosophy, Oxford University Press, 1987, xii+325 pp. 
 Autologic, Edinburgh University Press, 1992, xiii+239 pp. 
 The Taming of the True, Oxford University Press, 1997, xvii+465 pp. Paperback edition 2002. 
 "On the Degeneracy of the Full AGM-Theory of Theory-Revision", Journal of Symbolic Logic, vol. 71, no. 2, pp. 661–676, June 2006. 
 "New Foundations for a Relational Theory of Theory-Revision", Journal of Philosophical Logic, vol. 35, no. 5, pp. 489–52, October 2006.
 Introducing Philosophy: God, Mind, World, and Logic, Routledge, 2015.
 Core Logic, Oxford University Press, 2017.

See also
American philosophy
List of British philosophers

Notes and references

External links
 Academic home page

Living people
1950 births
Ohio State University faculty
American logicians
Distinguished professors of philosophy